Mogogi Gabonamong (born September 10, 1982 in Mmutlane) is a Botswana football (soccer) defensive midfielder and defender who among others played for South African Premier Soccer League club Bloemfontein Celtic and Botswana.  In 2011, Mogogi was the highest paid athlete from Botswana at $354,000 (USD).

Club career
Gabonamong has played for SuperSport United, Engen Santos, Township Rollers, FC Satmos, Caledonia AIA and Mogoditshane Fighters.

As a teenager he had a trial with English Premiership giants Manchester United.

International career
Since making his debut for Botswana at the age of sixteen in 1999, Gabonamong has been an integral part of the country's national side.

International goals

References

External links

1982 births
Living people
Botswana footballers
Botswana international footballers
Association football midfielders
Mogoditshane Fighters players
Association football defenders
Santos F.C. (South Africa) players
Township Rollers F.C. players
SuperSport United F.C. players
2012 Africa Cup of Nations players
TT Pro League players
F.C. Satmos players
Botswana expatriates in South Africa
Expatriate soccer players in South Africa
Expatriate footballers in Trinidad and Tobago
Botswana expatriate sportspeople in South Africa